Picramnia bullata is a species of plant in the Picramniaceae family, that is only known from its type specimen, which was collected from Loreto Province in Peru. It grows naturally in Amazon basin rainforest.

References

Picramniales
Flora of the Amazon
Flora of Peru
Vulnerable flora of South America
Plants described in 1990
Taxonomy articles created by Polbot